Michael Anthony Turelli is an American biologist who is Distinguished Professor of Genetics at the University of California, Davis. His research has focused on issues in quantitative genetics and on the Wolbachia genus of bacteria. He was elected a fellow of the American Academy of Arts and Sciences in 2005 and to the National Academy of Sciences in 2021. He was a Guggenheim Fellow at University College London in 1986.

References

External links
Faculty page

Living people
20th-century American biologists
21st-century American biologists
Scientists from Brooklyn
University of California, Riverside alumni
University of Washington alumni
University of California, Davis faculty
Fellows of the American Academy of Arts and Sciences
Members of the United States National Academy of Sciences
American geneticists
Population geneticists
Theoretical biologists
Year of birth missing (living people)